Sartana Kills Them All is a 1970 Spanish crime comedy western film directed by Rafael Romero Marchent, written by Mario Alabiso and Santiago Moncada and starring Gianni Garko, Guglielmo Spoletini and María Silva.

Cast

References

External links
 

1970s crime comedy films
Spanish crime comedy films
Spanish Western (genre) comedy films
1970s Western (genre) comedy films
Films directed by Rafael Romero Marchent
Films with screenplays by Joaquín Luis Romero Marchent
Films scored by Marcello Giombini
Columbia Pictures films
Plaion
Films with screenplays by Rafael Romero Marchent
1970 comedy films
1970 films